Aglaomorpha is a genus  of tiger moths in the family Erebidae.

Species
The genus consists of the following species:
Aglaomorpha histrio (Walker, 1855) - contains three subspecies. Found in China and possibly also in the Korean peninsula and Taiwan.
Aglaomorpha plagiata (Walker, 1855) - Found in southwestern China, northern Indochina, and the Himalayas.

See also
Callimorpha
Calpenia

References

Callimorphina
Moth genera